Aregnadem is a village in the Amasia Municipality of the Shirak Province of Armenia.

History
Aregnadem village was founded at end of 17th century and was called Gharachanta (Latinized Armenian spelling of Karaçanta, meaning black bag in Turkish). It was part of Aghbaba uchastok of Kars Okrug in Kars Oblast between 1878 and 1918. It was passed to Soviet Armenia according to treaties of Moscow and Kars in 1921. It was renamed as Azizbekov in honour of Mashadi Azizbeyov, one of the 26 Baku Commissars in 4 May 1939. Prior to 1988, the village was populated by Azerbaijanis, whereby "there was not a single Armenain family". The village was refounded in 1988 by Armenians from Georgia, Azerbaijan and Gyumri in 1988, after it. Finally, it took present name in 3 April 1991.

Demographics
The National Statistical Service of the Republic of Armenia (ARMSTAT) reported its population was 342 in 2010, down from 407 at the 2001 census.

The population of the village since 1897 is as follows:

References 

Communities in Shirak Province
Populated places in Shirak Province